Group C of the 2019 FIFA Women's World Cup took place from 9 to 18 June 2019. The group consisted of Australia, Brazil, Italy and Jamaica. The top two teams, Italy and Australia, along with the third-placed team, Brazil (as one of the four best third-placed teams), advanced to the round of 16.

Teams

Notes

Standings

In the round of 16:
 The winners of Group C, Italy, advanced to play the third-placed team of Group B, China PR.
 The runners-up of Group C, Australia, advanced to play the runners-up of Group A, Norway.
 The third-placed team of Group C, Brazil, advanced to play the winners of Group A, France (as one of the four best third-placed teams).

Matches
All times listed are local, CEST (UTC+2).

Australia vs Italy

Brazil vs Jamaica

Australia vs Brazil

Jamaica vs Italy

Jamaica vs Australia

Italy vs Brazil

Discipline
Fair play points would have been used as tiebreakers in the group if the overall and head-to-head records of teams were tied, or if teams had the same record in the ranking of third-placed teams. These were calculated based on yellow and red cards received in all group matches as follows:
first yellow card: minus 1 point;
indirect red card (second yellow card): minus 3 points;
direct red card: minus 4 points;
yellow card and direct red card: minus 5 points;

Only one of the above deductions were applied to a player in a single match.

References

External links
 
 2019 FIFA Women's World Cup Group C, FIFA.com

2019 FIFA Women's World Cup
Australia at the 2019 FIFA Women's World Cup
Italy at the 2019 FIFA Women's World Cup
Brazil at the 2019 FIFA Women's World Cup
Jamaica at the 2019 FIFA Women's World Cup